William Spencer (by 1473 – 1529 or later), of Ipswich, Suffolk, was an English merchant and politician.

He was a Member of Parliament (MP) for Ipswich in 1510.

References

15th-century births
16th-century deaths
15th-century English businesspeople
16th-century English businesspeople
Members of the Parliament of England (pre-1707) for Ipswich
English MPs 1510